Deepdale railway station (also known as Deepdale Bridge station) was on the Longridge Branch Line in Preston, Lancashire, England.

The station opened in 1856 as a replacement for Deepdale Street railway station which until then had been the Preston passenger terminus of the line. The new station lay on an extension, built in 1850, which connected to the earlier line near the level crossing in Skeffington Road.

Deepdale station was the headquarters of the Fleetwood, Preston and West Riding Junction Railway, which had bought the Preston and Longridge Railway. The new line and tunnel were originally built to connect the Longridge line to the existing Preston and Wyre Joint Railway, as part of a planned route from Fleetwood on the Fylde coast to Skipton in the West Riding of Yorkshire. However, that plan had already collapsed by 1852.

The station, along with others on the line, closed to regular passenger services on 31 May 1930. The last passenger trains to use Deepdale station were 1970s football supporters' specials bringing away fans to Deepdale Stadium to watch a football match. This was done to keep visiting supporters away from the town centre before and after the match.

The line through the station continued to be used for goods trains until the 1990s, and the tracks, though rusty and overgrown, still exist as far as the Skeffington Road level crossing.

References  
 Hunt, D. (2003) The Wharncliffe Companion to Preston — An A to Z of Local History, Wharncliffe Books, Barnsley, p. 117.
 Suggitt, G. (2003, revised 2004) Lost Railways of Lancashire, Countryside Books, Newbury, pp. 50–53.
 Till, J.M. (1993) A History of Longridge and its People, Carnegie Publishing, Preston, p. 91 and p. 98.

Disused railway stations in Preston
Former Preston and Longridge Railway stations
Railway stations in Great Britain opened in 1856
Railway stations in Great Britain closed in 1930
1856 establishments in England